SS Rondo was a steam cargo ship. She was built by Tampa Shipbuilding & Drydock Company of Florida for the British government under the name War Wonder and was launched in 1917. The First World War ended before she entered service and she entered service for the US Shipping Board as the Lithopolis. She was sold to various Norwegian companies, becoming the Laurie, and finally the Rondo in 1934.

She sank off the west coast of Scotland on 25 January 1935 in the Sound of Mull whilst seeking shelter from a storm.

References 

War Wonder
Steamships of the United Kingdom
Merchant ships of the United Kingdom
Wreck diving sites in the United Kingdom
Ships built in Tampa, Florida
1917 ships
Maritime incidents in 1935